Complete Failure, also known as "ComFail", is an American hardcore punk band from Pittsburgh, Pennsylvania.

History
In late 2007 Complete Failure  signed to Supernova Records, where they recorded Perversions of Guilt, recorded, mixed, and mastered by Steve Austin label owner and Today Is the Day frontman.  From March to July 2008 they toured the United States, Canada, and Europe with Today Is the Day and others, playing over 100 shows.

In April 2009 Complete Failure self-recorded and self-released their sophomore full length entitled Heal No Evil. In May 2009 they toured with Relapse Records artists Antigama. Relapse Records then re-released Heal No Evil after the first versions sold out completely.

Style and influences

Complete Failure's sound varies from droning hypnotic tribal rhythms to full speed blasting grindcore designed to confuse, disorient, and overwhelm the listener. The band’s influences come from underground punk and metal artists including Terrorizer, Napalm Death, Lock Up, Repulsion, His Hero Is Gone, Neurosis, Darkthrone, Mayhem, and others.

Band members
 Joe Mack - Vocals
 James Curl - Bass, Guitars
 Mark Bogacki - Bass

Discography
 Crossburner – Season of Mist Records – Released October 2017
 The Art Gospel of Aggravated Assault - Season of Mist Records - Released February 2013
 The Art Gospel of Aggravated Assault - UNRELEASED - Released 2011-2012
 Heal No Evil - Self Released - Released March 2009
 Perversions of Guilt - Supernova Records (SPNV 16) Released April 2008
 Three calluses of spit and depression (demo) - Self Released - 2007
 Praise the Brainwound (demo) - self-released - 2007 (digital demo)
 Good things happening to bad people - Live from Bern Switzerland (live) - Self-released - 2008
 Supernova Records Sampler 2007 (compilation) - Supernova Records - 2007
 Supernova Records Sampler 2008 (compilation) - Supernova Records - 2008

References

Hardcore punk groups from Pennsylvania
Relapse Records artists
Season of Mist artists
Musical groups from Pittsburgh